The 2018–19 Nemzeti Bajnokság II (also known as 2018–19 Merkantil Bank Liga) was Hungary's 68th season of the Nemzeti Bajnokság II, the second tier of the Hungarian football league system.

Team changes

Stadiums by capacity

Stadiums by locations

Personnel and kits

Managerial changes

League table

See also
 2018–19 Magyar Kupa
 2018–19 Nemzeti Bajnokság I
 2018–19 Nemzeti Bajnokság III

References

External links
  
  

Nemzeti Bajnokság II seasons
2018–19 in Hungarian football
Hun